Javier García Portillo (born 30 March 1982) is a Spanish former professional footballer who played as a forward.

He started out at Real Madrid and appeared in 59 competitive games during his tenure, scoring 17 goals. In La Liga, he also played for Gimnàstic, Osasuna and Hércules for a total of 131 matches and 21 goals, and also competed professionally in Italy and Belgium.

In a 14-year senior career, Portillo represented Hércules in all three major levels of Spanish football.

Club career
Portillo was born in Aranjuez, Community of Madrid. In 1994, aged 12, he entered Real Madrid's youth system. Over seven seasons he was a prolific scorer, netting 370 goals and breaking a record previously held by Raúl. In August 2002 he signed his first professional contract, running until 2006 with a buyout clause of €15 million.

On 6 October 2002, Portillo made his first La Liga appearance and second overall for the main squad, starting in a 5–2 home win over Deportivo Alavés and ending that season with five goals in only ten games. He also scored a vital last-minute equaliser against Borussia Dortmund in the UEFA Champions League second group phase, a goal which ultimately proved to be crucial to reach the knockout stages.

Portillo was loaned to Serie A side ACF Fiorentina in July 2004, but was recalled by new manager Vanderlei Luxemburgo, who arrived midway through the 2004–05 campaign. However, the same coach deemed him surplus to requirements and another loan ensued, to Club Brugge KV of the Belgian Pro League.
 
At the end of this loan period, Portillo returned to Real under newly hired coach Fabio Capello. With new signing Ruud van Nistelrooy adding to already present Raúl, Antonio Cassano and Ronaldo, he was released and signed a two-year contract with recently promoted Gimnàstic de Tarragona.

After a successful individual season (12 goals in all competitions, although the Catalans were relegated from the top flight), in July 2007 Portillo replaced at Osasuna Roberto Soldado, who returned from loan to Real Madrid. He was used irregularly in his first two years, and only netted three times in the league.

In late December 2009, Portillo – who was only fourth or fifth-choice striker for Osasuna coach José Antonio Camacho– finally moved clubs, signing until the end of the season plus two more with Segunda División's Hércules CF. After some time to adjust he finished in the starting XI, netting vital goals in the final stretch, including one in the last round for a 2–0 victory at Real Unión as the Alicante side returned to the first division after 13 years.

Portillo returned to reserve status in 2010–11, after Hércules signed David Trezeguet and Nelson Valdez in the off-season. He only started through injury or suspension to the pair, and scored just twice in official matches, one coming in a 3–1 away defeat of Real Sociedad on 3 April 2011, with Hércules being immediately relegated.

On 2 August 2011, Portillo signed for three years with UD Las Palmas in the second tier. For the 2012–13 season, however, he moved teams again, returning to Hércules on a three-year deal.

In late December 2015, Portillo announced his retirement at the age of 33. Subsequently, he worked as his last club's director of football.

International career
Making his debut in 2002 – shortly after his arrival at the Real Madrid senior setup – Portillo played ten times for Spain under-21s, and scored five goals.

Career statistics

Honours
Real Madrid
La Liga: 2002–03
Supercopa de España: 2003
UEFA Champions League: 2001–02
UEFA Super Cup: 2002

Individual
Copa del Rey top scorer: 2002–03 (8 goals)

References

External links

1982 births
Living people
People from Aranjuez
Spanish footballers
Footballers from the Community of Madrid
Association football forwards
La Liga players
Segunda División players
Segunda División B players
Real Madrid Castilla footballers
Real Madrid CF players
Gimnàstic de Tarragona footballers
CA Osasuna players
Hércules CF players
UD Las Palmas players
Serie A players
ACF Fiorentina players
Belgian Pro League players
Club Brugge KV players
UEFA Champions League winning players
Spain under-21 international footballers
Spanish expatriate footballers
Expatriate footballers in Italy
Expatriate footballers in Belgium
Spanish expatriate sportspeople in Italy
Spanish expatriate sportspeople in Belgium